Bát Xát is a rural district of Lào Cai province in the Northeast region of Vietnam. As of 2003, the district had a population of 62,477. The district covers an area of 1,050 km2. The district capital lies at Bát Xát.

Administrative divisions
Bát Xát, Cốc San, Tòng Sanh, Phìn Ngan, Quang Kim, Bản Qua, Mường Vị, Bản Vược, Bản Xèo, Pa Cheo, Nậm Pung, Trung Lènh Hồ, Mường Hum, Dền Thàng, Sáng Ma Sáo, Dền Sáng, Cốc Mỳ, Y Tý, Ngải Thầu, A Lù, A Mú Sung, Nậm Chạc and Trịnh Tường.

References

Districts of Lào Cai province
Lào Cai province